Andre McIntosh McCarthy (born 8 June 1987) is a Jamaican cricketer. He played for the West Indies in the 2006 Under-19 Cricket World Cup in Sri Lanka. He plays domestically for Jamaica and the Jamaica Tallawahs.

In March 2018, he was named in the West Indies squad for their Twenty20 International (T20I) series against Pakistan. He made his T20I debut for the West Indies against Pakistan on 3 April 2018.

He was the leading run-scorer for Jamaica in the 2018–19 Regional Super50 tournament, with 334 runs in nine matches. In October 2019, he was named in Jamaica's squad for the 2019–20 Regional Super50 tournament. In July 2020, he was named in the Jamaica Tallawahs squad for the 2020 Caribbean Premier League.

In December 2020, McCarthy was named in the West Indies' One Day International (ODI) squad for their series against Bangladesh. He made his ODI debut for the West Indies, against Bangladesh, on 20 January 2021.

In June 2021, he was selected to take part in the Minor League Cricket tournament in the United States following the players' draft.

References

External links

1987 births
Living people
West Indies One Day International cricketers
West Indies Twenty20 International cricketers
Jamaican cricketers
Sportspeople from Kingston, Jamaica
Jamaica cricketers
Jamaica Tallawahs cricketers
Saint Lucia Kings cricketers
Sylhet Strikers cricketers